Gingerdead Man 2: Passion of the Crust is a 2008 American slasher film written and directed by Silvia St. Croix.  The film is a sequel to the 2005 film The Gingerdead Man. The distributor of the film is Full Moon Entertainment. The film was originally titled Gingerdead Man 2: Bakery of Blood.

Plot
Kelvin Cheatum (K-von Moezzi) is trying to save his father's studio from bankruptcy by producing worthy heirs to his father's slate of classic low-budget cult films. Cheatum Studio's current productions include Hamburger Time Traveler Detective, Space Spankers 2015, and the ninth entry of his father's famous killer puppet franchise Tiny Terrors 9: Purgatory of the Petite; however, things aren't going as planned: the cast and crew members are losing patience with the long hours, lack of pay, terrible scripts, and Kelvin's over-reliance on goodwill towards his father. A blogger who goes by the name of "Demon Warrior 13" is organizing effective boycotts of their films.

A puppet exploding during a shot has brought matters to a head and an open brawl has broken out on the set. In the ensuing chaos, Tommy Hines (Joseph Porter), using a wheelchair and battling a terminal illness, arrives from The End of the Rainbow Last Wish Foundation with his caseworker Heather Crocker (Kelsey Sanders). His final wish before he dies is to tour the studio and see the star puppets from the Tiny Terrors franchise.

Meanwhile, Polly Bonderhoof (Michelle Bauer) attempts to restore order with a box of baked goods from her sister in Waco, Texas, which includes the Gingerdead Man (voiced by John Vulich). He slips out of the pastry box and locates a spellbook in the prop room, which includes a transmigration spell to transfer his soul out of his stale form and into a human body. The spell calls for blood from five victims placed in a pentagram, and then the sacrifice of one more victim, who must be a virgin.

The Gingerdead Man kills four people in various gruesome ways, but is driven off by Kelvin and Heather as he cuts the handoff of a crew member. Kelvin orders the studio evacuated and sets off with Heather to confront the cookie and find Tommy, which goes badly when the Gingerdead Man seizes control of a prop robot with functioning lasers and disintegrates Jake. Tommy cuts the robot's power cord with an ax and it topples over, momentarily trapping the Gingerdead Man beneath it. Tommy reveals himself to be "Demon Warrior 13," who has faked his illness in order to gain access to the studio and blow it up as revenge for the studio non-responsiveness to the scripts he has submitted. Kelvin offers a three picture deal while Heather sneaks up behind Tommy and attempts to bludgeon him. The assault fails and Kelvin is knocked unconscious.

Kelvin wakes, chained next to Heather on an altar on the Tiny Terrors set. Tommy is reading an incantation from the spellbook, but the Gingerdead Man fatally stabs Tommy from behind, making him the sixth (and virginal) victim of the Transmigration. The gingerdead man, unsure whether one of the victims (the man with the cut off hand) is still alive, changes his plan, and decides to use Kelvin's body as his new host. It is revealed, as the spell finishes, that the gingerdead man has made a mistake - by letting the blood of the virgin touch the pentagram, the spell is tainted, and he accidentally invokes a spell for bringing dolls to life. The dolls from the set of Tiny Terrors animate themselves, and then attack the Gingerdead Man. They hold him down while one of them gets a cross, drag him to the cross, and crucify him (complete with crown of thorns,) before burning him on the cross.  One of the actors from the movie, Sir Ian Cavanaugh (Jacob Witkin), bursts in and shoots all of the puppets with an AK-47.

Sometime later, it is shown that Kelvin has married Heather and Tiny Terrors has won an award for Best Horror Hand Puppet Motion Picture, while a homeless man (Adam Green), digging for food in a dumpster, comes across the burnt cookie. He takes a bite and becomes possessed by the Gingerdead Man.

Cast

The film’s credits give a number of characters last names that are not mentioned in the film itself. Several of these are references to major food companies (specifically ones that produce snack cakes and goods) or puns such as “Crocker, Hines/Heinz, Entemann, Nestle, Pillsbury” and “Cinabonus”. There are also a number of jokes within the credits themselves such as listing Edgar Allan Poe as “Scary Writer Dude”, John Vulich simply as “Himself” instead of “Gingerdead Man”, and Stephanie Denton as “Still owes Silvia twenty bucks”.

 John Vulich as “Himself“ (The Gingerdead Man)
 K-von Moezzi as Kelvin Cheatum - failing producer and heir to Cheatum Studios
 Kelsey Sanders as Heather Crocker - an employee for End of the Rainbow Last Wish Foundation
 Joseph Porter as Tommy Hines - supposedly a boy with terminal illness wishing to gain access to Cheatum Studios
 Frank Nicotero as Marty Dradel-Brillstein-Schwartz - Cheatum Studios Operations Manager
 Jon Southwell as Jake Jackson - Stuntman 
 Jacob Witkin as Sir Ian Cavanaugh - a distinguished actor who‘s been duped into starring in Tiny Terrors 9
 Michelle Bauer as Polly bunderhoof - “a one-time siren scream-queen, now turned, craft services ‘cougar’ girl”; a reference to Bauer’s work in pornographic and horror films throughout the 80’s (Gingerdead Man’s 3rd victim) 
 Bruce Dent as Ricki Johnson - makeup artist (Gingerdead Man’s 2nd victim)
 Emily Button as Wendy Heinz
 Parker Young as Cornelius Entemann - young, attractive actor (Gingerdead Man’s 4th victim) 
 Vivian Waye as Zira Cinabonus
 Bryce Wagoner as Tim Nestle
 Johnnie Oberg Jr. as Butch Pillsbury
 Kenneth J. Hall as Lord Astroth
 Chi Chi Garcia as Cholo Wardrobe Lady
 Nick Green as hungry-Man Grip
 David Sivits as Muscle Angel
 Ricardo Gil as Angry Elf
 Julian Fries as Bitter Efx Guy
 Travis Dixon as Major Nelson Newton
 Junie Hoang as Ensign Del Rio
 Nic Haas (Nick Hawk) as Lt. Grant Ginger
 Bryan Pisano as Dr. Lupas Callahan
 Nicole Shilperoort as Nubile Untouched young Virgin
 Nicolas Leiting as Killer Robot
 JD Parsons as Bewildered Production Assistant
 Kennedy Clarke as Burned-Out Crew Member
 Zach Wagoner as Flabbergasted Efx Guy
 Michael Penfold as Beaten Down Crew Member
 Merideth Corrado as Roid-Rage Fueled Crew Member
 James R. Rosenthal as Hungover Crew Member
 Edgar Allan Poe as Scary Writer Dude
 Pieter Coulson as Shady Crew Member
 David DeCoteau as himself
 Greg Nicotero as himself
 Adam Green as Toothless McHomeless
 Stephanie Denton as Still owes Silvia twenty bucks

Reception
Gingerdead Man 2: Passion of the Crust received mixed reviews.

The website GeekTyrant gave a positive review stating, "Gingerdead Man 2: The Passion of the Crust is as much fun as you could expect from a Full Moon movie. Watching each victim (this time on a movie set) get stalked down and killed by this killer cookie is just laughable yet still enjoyable to the point it just draws you in."

Review site That Was A Bit Mental praised how the film was a jab at the film history of Full Moon Entertainment involving dolls or toys in the plot of many of their stories, such as their  Puppet Master films. They said in their review "There’s no need to see the original Gingerdead Man, but if you fancy a self-aware film that’s deliberately cheap and nasty and makes fun of itself for being so, then give this a go."

Dread Central also praised the self-aware nature of the movie, but criticized the somewhat bitter delivery of the film regarding critics which was expressed throughout. Their review stated, "though I must say it takes a certain degree of ballsy cynicism to make a movie where you basically admit the movies you make are crap while still taking considerable time to bitch about online critics like myself who pan them for being crap, even more so when you consider this movie was directed by someone who chose to use a pseudonym rather than put their real name in the credits." The site also criticized the DVD release for its lack of interesting special features for it is just trailers for previous Full Moon Entertainment films.

Pop Horror review for Gingerdead Man 2 was positive, finding the characters to be better written and liking the use of practical effects. The less serious tone compared to the previous film was also praised. The review concluded "All in all, Full Moon scores a goal with Gingerdead Man 2: Passion of the Crust. It’s trashy entertainment at its finest!"

Felix Vasquez Jr. at Cinema Crazed gave the film a negative review and wrote: "Mostly forgettable, and clocking in at a little over an hour, it's just lazy."

Sequel

On July 16, 2008, Charles Band announced that he would be making Gingerdead Man 3: Saturday Night Cleaver, which he expected to be released in 2009. It was said to be about "the title fiend traveling back in time to the 1970s, where he murders the contestants in a roller-disco contest." William Butler, scriptwriter of the Gingerdead Man films, says, "There'll be more laughs and gore than the second one." The film was initially slated for a 2009 release, but filming was delayed until September 13, 2011

See also
 Killer Toys

References

External links
 
 The film at the DTMDB

2000s Christmas horror films
2008 comedy horror films
2008 films
American slasher films
American comedy horror films
American Christmas horror films
Slasher comedy films
Supernatural comedy films
Puppet films
Supernatural slasher films
Gingerdead Man (film series)
2000s English-language films
2000s American films